Saint-Jean-la-Poterie is a commune in the Morbihan department of Brittany in north-western France.

Geography
The river Arz forms part of the commune's northern border, then flows into the Oust, which forms most of its eastern boundary.

Demographics
Inhabitants of Saint-Jean-la-Poterie are called in French Potians.

See also
Communes of the Morbihan department

References

External links

 Mayors of Morbihan Association 

Saintjeanlapoterie